The National Immigration Forum is an immigrant advocacy non-profit group, based in Washington, DC. It was founded by Phyllis Eisen and Rick Swartz . The Forum uses its communications, advocacy and policy expertise to advocate for immigration, refugees and funding to foreign nations.

Ali Noorani has served as the Forum's Executive Director since 2008.

The Forum focuses on four main priorities: pro-immigration laws and business demands, increasing the number of both immigrants and refugees, cutting interior enforcement of borders and state and local immigration developments (the Forum promotes the Constitutional principle that immigration law and enforcement are federal responsibilities).

References

External links 
 National Immigration Forum

Immigrant rights organizations in the United States